Jamana Devi Barupal (born 15 August 1934) is a former Indian politician. He is a former Member of Parliament in Rajya Sabha from Rajasthan. Leader of Indian National Congress.

References

1934 births
Rajya Sabha members from Rajasthan
Living people
Place of birth missing (living people)
Indian National Congress politicians from Rajasthan